Judge Mark Bomani (2 January 1932 – 10 September 2020) served as the second Attorney General of Tanzania from 1965 to 1976. Later he was a judge and ran a private law practice.

Political History 
Bomani was the Attorney General of Tanzania from 1965 to 1976 and was the first attorney general to be born in Tanzania. After serving in the government, he became a senior legal advisory in the United Nations between 1976 and 1990, working towards Namibian independence from South Africa and working to devise an independent legal system for the country.

Bomani had great international negotiation experience and was also the chief aide to both Julius Nyerere and Nelson Mandela on peace negotiations during the first Burundian Civil War.

References

1932 births
2020 deaths
Chama Cha Mapinduzi politicians
Attorneys General of Tanzania
20th-century Tanzanian judges